Serangoon was a constituency in Singapore from 1951 until 1959. The constituency was represented in the Legislative Council from 1951 until 1955. 

In 1955, the constituency was formed from Changi Constituency. In 1959, the constituency was abolished and split into Serangoon Gardens, Thomson and Upper Serangoon constituencies.

Member of Parliament

Elections

Elections in the 1950s

References 

1955 establishments in Singapore
1959 disestablishments in Singapore
Singaporean electoral divisions